Gaoshu Township is a rural township in Pingtung County, Taiwan.

Geography

Administrative divisions

The township comprises 19 villages: Cailiao, Dapu, Gaoshu, Guangfu, Guangxing, Jianxing, Jiuliao, Jiuzhuang, Nanhua, Sima, Taishan, Tianzi, Tungxing, Tungzhen, Xinfeng, Xinnan, Yanshu, Yuanquan and Zhangrong.

Tourist attractions

 Jiaruipu Temple

Notable natives
 Chen Chi-nan, Minister of Council of Cultural Affairs (2004–2006)
 Chung Li-ho, novelist

References

External links 
 Gaoshu Township Office website 
 

Townships in Pingtung County